Prastuti Parashar (Porasor)  is an actress from Assam, India.  She has acted in a number of Assamese movies and stage dramas.

Early life and education
Prastuti Parashar was born at Malow Ali in Jorhat, Assam. Her father Bijoy Chandra Sarma was the former principal of Jagannath Barooah College.

Career
She started acting career at age of around 5 years through a serial named Barnali in Doordarshan Guwahati. Her debut Assamese film was Bani Das's Maharathi, which was released in 1999.

Filmography

Feature films

Television
She acted in few television serials.
Barnali
Nisar Nayak
Chakrabehu
Mahanagar
Major Sahab
Jonakat Siharan
Bindaas
Sendur
Saahu Buwari ( Anthology series:lead in a story)
Prohelika (Anthology series: lead in a story)
Yeh Dosti
Rakhe Hori Mare Kune

Stage plays
Few of her stage plays are:
Rupalim
Nimati Koina
Aparahna
Asankar Din Rati

Awards and nominations

References

External links
 
 Prastuti Parashar at rupaliparda.com

Living people
Actresses in Assamese cinema
People from Jorhat district
Indian film actresses
Actresses from Assam
Year of birth missing (living people)